This is a list of works by American jazz musician Carla Bley.

Albums

As leader 
 

 1974: Tropic Appetites (WATT)
 1977: Dinner Music (WATT)
 1978: European Tour 1977 (WATT)
 1979: Musique Mecanique (WATT)
 1981: Social Studies (WATT)
 1982: Live! (WATT)
 1983: Mortelle Randonnée (Mercury) – Soundtrack
 1984: I Hate to Sing (WATT)
 1984: Heavy Heart (WATT)
 1985: Night-Glo (WATT) with Steve Swallow
 1987: Sextet (WATT)
 1988: Duets (WATT) with Steve Swallow
 1989: Fleur Carnivore (WATT)
 1991: The Very Big Carla Bley Band (WATT)
 1992: Go Together (WATT) with Steve Swallow
 1993: Big Band Theory (WATT)
 1994: Songs with Legs (WATT) with Andy Sheppard and Steve Swallow
 1996: The Carla Bley Big Band Goes to Church (WATT)
 1998: Fancy Chamber Music (WATT)
 1999: Are We There Yet? (WATT) with Steve Swallow
 2000: 4 x 4 (WATT)
 2003: Looking for America (WATT)
 2004: The Lost Chords (WATT)
 2007: The Lost Chords find Paolo Fresu (WATT)
 2008: Appearing Nightly (WATT)
 2009: Carla's Christmas Carols (WATT)
 2013: Trios (ECM) with Andy Sheppard and Steve Swallow
 2015: Andando el Tiempo (ECM) with Andy Sheppard and Steve Swallow
 2020: Life Goes On (ECM) with Andy Sheppard and Steve Swallow

Collaborations 
With Gary Burton
 1967: A Genuine Tong Funeral (RCA)
With the Jazz Composer's Orchestra
 1966: Communication (Fontana) Jazz Composer's Orchestra
 1968: The Jazz Composer's Orchestra (JCOA) (led by Michael Mantler)
 1968-71: Escalator over the Hill (JCOA) (a chronotransduction by Carla Bley & Paul Haines)
 1973: Relativity Suite (JCOA) (led by Don Cherry)
 1975: The Gardens of Harlem (JCOA) (led by Clifford Thornton)
 1975: Echoes of Prayer (JCOA) (led by Grachan Moncur III)
With Michael Mantler
 1966: Jazz Realities (Fontana) (with Steve Lacy)
 1973: No Answer (WATT) (with Jack Bruce & Don Cherry – texts by Samuel Beckett)
 1975: 13 & ¾ (WATT) 
 1976: The Hapless Child (WATT) (texts by Edward Gorey)
 1976: Silence (WATT) (texts by Harold Pinter)
 1977: Movies (WATT) 
 1980: More Movies (WATT) 
 1982: Something There (WATT) 
With Charlie Haden and the Liberation Music Orchestra
 1969: Liberation Music Orchestra (Impulse!)
 1983: The Ballad of the Fallen (ECM)
 1990: Dream Keeper (Blue Note)
 2005: Not in Our Name (Verve)
 2016: Time/Life (Impulse!)
With Nick Mason
 1979: Nick Mason's Fictitious Sports (Harvest) (released in 1981)
With Steve Swallow
 1986-7: Carla
 1992: Swallow
 2013: Into the Woodwork

As sidewoman 
 1975: Jack Bruce – The Jack Bruce Band Live '75  (released 2003)
 1975: Jack Bruce – Live on the Old Grey Whistle Test (released 1998)
 1977: John Greaves – Kew. Rhone.
 1981: Amarcord Nino Rota (Hannibal) — various artists tribute to Nino Rota (performs "8½")
 1984: That's the Way I Feel Now (A&M) — various artists tribute to Thelonious Monk (performs "Misterioso")
 1985: Lost in the Stars: The Music of Kurt Weill — various artists tribute to Kurt Weill (performs "Lost in the Stars")
1971-85: Gary Windo – His Master's Bones
1985: The Golden Palominos – Visions of Excess
1991: The Golden Palominos – Drunk with Passion
1995: Jazz to the World — various artists (performs "Let It Snow")

Videography 

 1983/2003: Live in Montreal (DVD)

Compositions recorded by other artists

References 

Discographies of American artists
Jazz discographies